The Peralta Home, at 561 Lafayette Avenue in San Leandro was the first brick house built in Alameda County. It was constructed in the Spanish Colonial style in 1860 for Ignacio Peralta, early San Leandro Spanish settler, by W.P. Toler (Peralta's son-in-law).

A.C. Peachey purchased the house from Rafaela Sanchez Peralta (Igancio's widow) on May 18, 1875. Immediately thereafter Peachey added a large wood extension at the back of the brick house. Technically a -story building, the old Peralta house had its main reception rooms on the second story. Peachey continued this emphasis on the second story in his additions, treating the ground floor as a basement.

The house remained in the Peachey family for thirty-four years. Between 1909 and 1926, it went to Daniel and C.L. Best. Eventually in November 1926, it was purchased by the Alta Mira Club, who are still the current owners. One of the more interesting of 19th-century houses in San Leandro, it has additional historic associations with the large and land-rich Peralta family, who were pioneers of the area. Peralta's father, Luís María Peralta, received the Rancho San Antonio land grant from Spanish Governor Don Pablo Vicente de Solá on October 20, 1820.

The house is a California Historical Landmark and is listed on the National Register of Historic Places (NPS-78000654).

References

External links

Alta Mira Club - Historic Peralta Home, official website

San Leandro, California
History of Alameda County, California
California Historical Landmarks
National Register of Historic Places in Alameda County, California
Houses completed in 1860
Houses on the National Register of Historic Places in California
Houses in Alameda County, California
1860 establishments in California